Chintakani or Chinthakani is a mandal in Khammam district of Telangana, India.

Demographics
As per 2011 Census, the statistics of the mandal are:
 Total Population: 	47,962	in 11,898 Households. 	
 Male Population: 	24,271	and Female Population: 	23,691		
 Children Under 6-years of age: 6,028	(Boys -	3,010 and Girls -	3,018)
 Total Literates: 	21,483

References

Mandals in Khammam district